Francisco Echevarría (born 4 June 1947) is a Guatemalan weightlifter. He competed in the men's featherweight event at the 1968 Summer Olympics.

References

1947 births
Living people
Guatemalan male weightlifters
Olympic weightlifters of Guatemala
Weightlifters at the 1968 Summer Olympics
People from Alta Verapaz Department